The Kom Monastery is a Serbian Orthodox monastery in Montenegro. It is located on the small island of Odrinska gora, close to Žabljak Crnojevića, where the Crnojević River flows into the western section of Lake Skadar. The Kom Monastery was built between 1415 and 1427, as an endowment of Đurađ and Aleksa Đurašević, members of the Crnojević noble family. The monastery continued the cult of the Virgin Mary, which had been greatly expanded during the earlier rule of the Balšići. The monastery also continued the tradition of building mausoleums. The oldest frescoes in the monastery are from the second half of the 15th century. For a short period of time, the monastery was the seat of the Zetan Metropolitanate. In the Kom Monastery in 1831, Petar II Petrović-Njegoš was appointed as the archimandrite of the Metropolitanate of Montenegro.

References

Sources

Istorijski Leksikon Crne Gore: K-Per 

15th-century Serbian Orthodox church buildings
Medieval Montenegro
Crnojević noble family
Cetinje Municipality
Monasteries in Montenegro